The Business is a 2005 crime film written and directed by Nick Love. The film stars Danny Dyer, Tamer Hassan and Roland Manookian, all of whom were in Love's previous film The Football Factory. Geoff Bell and Georgina Chapman also appear. The plot of The Business follows the Greek tragedy-like rise and fall of a young cockney's career within a drug importing business run by a group of British expatriate fugitive criminals living on the Costa del Sol in Spain.

Plot
The film is narrated by Frankie, a young everyman living in South East London during the Thatcher era of the 1980s specifically 1984, with little hope of ever making anything of himself, yet he dreams of "being somebody" and escaping his lonely, dreary lifestyle. After severely beating his mother's abusive boyfriend, he becomes a fugitive, and through family connections escapes to the Costa del Sol. His job there is to deliver a bag containing money to "Playboy Charlie", an expat and criminal-on-the-run, a suave and dapper man who runs his own nightclub. Impressed by Frankie's honesty in not opening the bag, Charlie takes a liking to Frankie, introduces him to his business associates, including the psychopathic Sammy, and invites him to remain in Spain and work as his driver.

Frankie discovers that they are in fact the "Peckham Four", wanted for armed robbery back in Britain. However, Frankie decides he prefers an exciting life of sun, drugs, women, money, fast cars, designer clothes, and a reputation, as opposed to being a nobody back in London. Frankie soon accepts and becomes involved in the business of smuggling hashish across the Strait of Gibraltar from Morocco, in which children are used although the children are sometimes shot dead by the Spanish Navy patrolmen.

The film then follows the rise-and-fall pattern common to many gangster films, showing first the criminals living the high life as their cannabis trade is booming, and then the downfall as greed and paranoia (not helped by the obvious attraction between Frankie and Sammy's beautiful trophy wife Carly) introduce conflict between them, and eventually split them up. Charlie and Frankie decide to go into business alone, importing cocaine instead of cannabis through drop-offs from Colombian aeroplanes, but this is the cause of the final problem. Not only do they both become increasingly addicted to the drug itself, but the local mayor, who had been happy to ignore the cannabis trade but had warned them not to import cocaine, discovers what they are doing and uses the weight of the law to shut them down and close their businesses. An assassination attempt on the mayor's life ends in failure, and the gruesome beheading of one of the gang.

Six months later Frankie and Charlie are homeless thugs, reduced to stealing in order to survive. While organising a disappointing reunion party at Charlie's old bar (which Frankie's former heroin addicted friend Sonny is now running), Frankie meets the scheming Carly again and decides to make one last deal. He invites Sammy in on a pick-up, but while both intend to betray the other, Carly has given Sammy a pistol with an empty clip. Sammy tries to shoot Frankie, who in turn attacks him with a rock. The fight ends abruptly as Spanish Navy patrolmen's gunfire fatally shoots Sammy. Frankie escapes through a sewage pipe and emerges to meet Carly, who had masterminded the whole thing. It seems that he is getting his happy ending, but at the last minute he realises he can't trust Carly when he finds another pistol in her handbag amongst their money, so he knocks her unconscious and drives off triumphantly into the sunset on his own.

The ending reveals that Sonny cleaned up his act and continued to run Charlie's old bar, which he did so successfully, whilst Charlie was reduced to working on the door. The theatrical ending also reveals that "Carly went back to her parents' house in Penge", "Sammy went to Hell" and "Frankie went to Hollywood".

Cast
 Danny Dyer as Frankie
 Tamer Hassan as Charlie
 Geoff Bell as Sammy
 Georgina Chapman as Carly
 Linda Henry as Shirley
 Roland Manookian as Sonny
 Camille Coduri as Nora
 Andy Parfitt as Andy
 Michael Maxwell as Jimmy
 Arturo Venegas as The Mayor
 Eddie Webber as Ronnie
 Dan Mead as Danny
 Martin Marquez as the mayor's aide
 Sally Watkins as Mum
 Alex Goodger as Dead Moroccan Child

Soundtrack
The original music for the film was written by Ivor Guest, but most of the soundtrack consists of popular 80s chart hits, which give the film much of its atmosphere and flavour. The soundtrack shares some of the tracks (Nick Love's 2004 film, The Football Factory). The songs featured include:

 Duran Duran – "Planet Earth"
 Frankie Goes to Hollywood – "Welcome to the Pleasuredome"
 Mary Jane Girls – "All Night Long"
 The Cult – "Wild Flower"
 Loose Ends – "Hangin' on a String (Contemplating)"
 Rick James – "Ghetto Life"
 Blondie - "Heart of Glass"
 Simple Minds – "Don't You (Forget About Me)"
 Martha and the Muffins – "Echo Beach"
 The Buggles – "Video Killed the Radio Star"
 A Flock of Seagulls – "I Ran (So Far Away)"
 Belouis Some – "Imagination"
 Shannon – "Let the Music Play"
 David Bowie – "Modern Love"
 Talk Talk – "It's My Life"
 The Knack – "My Sharona"
 Roxy Music – "Avalon"
 Simple Minds - "Themes For Great Cities"
 Orchestral Manoeuvres in the Dark – "Maid of Orleans"
 Adam and the Ants – "Kings of the Wild Frontier"
 Blondie – "Call Me"
 Kim Carnes – "Bette Davis Eyes"

Critical reception
The Business was nominated for "Best Achievement in Production" at the 2005 British Independent Film Award, although it lost to Gypo.

Upon release, The Business received largely positive reviews from lads' mags, which also targeted the same audience as the intended audience of the film. Front Magazine said the film has "more guns than Goodfellas, more coke than Casino and more swearing than Scarface"; Nuts magazine said that the film is "the coolest British film since Layer Cake". Zoo magazine said "this film will actually make you think that the '80s were cool. Another top job by the director of The Football Factory"; What's on TV said "A rush of '80s mood, fashion and music and nailbiting climax are the icing on a brilliant crime cake".

Outside of the lads' mags, critical reception to the film was mixed to negative. The Business currently has a 50% rating on aggregate ratings site Rotten Tomatoes based on six reviews.

References

External links
 
 
 
 

2005 films
2005 crime drama films
British crime drama films
Films about drugs
Films directed by Nick Love
Films set in Spain
Films set in the 1980s
British gangster films
Vertigo Films films
2000s English-language films
2000s British films